() is a 1960 tokusatsu science fiction-horror and mystery film.  Produced by Toho Company, Ltd., the film was directed by Jun Fukuda, with special effects by Eiji Tsuburaya.  Herts-Lion International Corp. acquired the western hemisphere rights to the film in January 1964 and planned to release it theatrically in the United States. This proposed U.S. theatrical release was aborted, and the film was subsequently syndicated to television. Besides being in black and white, the TV prints were identical to Toho's uncut international English version, dubbing and all.

Plot
At an amusement park's "Cave of Horrors" attraction, a man is stabbed to death and the killer leaves behind a gold-plated dog tag, a note asking the victim to meet them there, and a piece of Cryotron transistor wire. Reporter Kirioka, his childhood friend Detective Kobayashi, and the police led by Captain Onosaki begin investigating. They discover clues that lead them to a military-themed nightclub called the Military-Land Cabaret and its suspicious owner, Onishi.

Kirioka, Kobayashi, and Onosaki eventually discover that 14 years prior, Onishi, the victim, intelligence agent Takashi, and Construction Corp. foreman Taki were all soldiers assigned to protect scientist/electrical engineer Dr. Kajuro Nikki's top secret experiments in creating electronic weaponry. However, the four used the scientist to transport stolen gold instead. They faced opposition from Lance Corporal Tsudo, who insisted that the gold belonged to Japan's people, but Onishi and his compatriots seemingly killed Tsudo and Nikki. They stored the bodies and gold in a cave and narrowly escaped after it was destroyed by dynamite. When the four returned a year later however, they discovered the corpses and gold had gone missing.

In reality, Tsudo and Nikki went into hiding and lived in seclusion on a remote farm. Over the years, the scientist perfected a teleportation device capable of moving matter from one place to another in seconds. Unbeknownst to Nikki, a bitter Tsudo used the machine to elude the police while seeking revenge on his would-be killers by using the dog tags as a death sentence, sending his victims an audio tape or note detailing his intentions, and stabbing them with a bayonet.

Kirioka, Kobayashi, and Onosaki trace Tsudo back to his farm, but are unable to prove he is the killer despite finding Nikki and his machines. Concurrently, Taki is killed while in police custody while Onishi hides in a remote coastal village. However, Tsudo knew he would go there and sends him a transmitter so he can successfully kill him. The police give chase, but Tsudo retrieves a hidden transmitter and begins to teleport, only for tremors to damage the receiver and cause Tsudo to dissolve into oblivion.

Cast
 Tadao Nakamaru as Sudo, alias Goro Nakamoto
 Koji Tsuruta as Reporter Kirioka 
 Akihiko Hirata as Detective Kobayashi
 Yoshio Tsuchiya as Onosaki, Detective Captain  
 Seizaburo Kawazu as Masayoshi Onishi, Kainan Trade President 
 Sachio Sakai as Taki 
 Yoshifumi Tajima as Syogen, Cabaret Manager 
 Fuyuki Murakami as Miura, Scientist 
 Takamaru Sasaki as Takaki      
 Shin Otomo as Sukimoto, Broker  
 Ikio Sawamura as Amusement Park Announcer 
 Ren Yamamoto as Inspector 
 Akira Kitano, Yutaka Nakayama, Yutaka Sada, Tadashi Okabe as Policemen 
 Hideyo Amamoto, Nadao Kirino, Shoichi Hirose as Onishi's Henchmen 
 Senkichi Omura, Hironobu Wakamoto as Fishermen 
 Yasuhisa Tsutsumi, Tatsuo Matsumura as Officials 
 Akira Sera as Club Announcer 
 Koji Uno as Trucker

Production

Writing
First written by Shinichi Sekizawa in 1959, Ishiro Honda was originally meant to direct this film, but he left the film to direct Battle in Outer Space (1959), which had been delayed due to the production of The Birth of Japan (1959), instead. In his place, Toho chose Jun Fukuda, who had previously acted as an assistant director on Rodan, to direct the film. Honda would go on to direct the third entry in the mutant Series, The Human Vapor.

Release
The Secret of the Telegian was released in Japan on April 10, 1960, in color and TohoScope. The film was released with English subtitles by Toho International with North American theatrical rights purchased by Herts-Lion International, who would later release the film directly to American television in pan-and-scan, black and white. The film was screened in Los Angeles for a trade screening on July 21, 1961.

References

Footnotes

Sources

External links
 

 

1960 horror films
1960s action films
1960s crime films
1960s science fiction horror films
1960s thriller films
Films directed by Jun Fukuda
Films set in Aichi Prefecture
Films set in Nagano Prefecture
Films set in Tokyo
1960s mystery films
Japanese serial killer films
Toho tokusatsu films
1960 films
Films with screenplays by Shinichi Sekizawa
1960s Japanese films